Popescu (Francisized as Popesco) is a family name very common in Romania (derived from popă, meaning priest). Used on its own, it may refer to:
Adrian Popescu, football (soccer) player
Călin Popescu-Tăriceanu, politician
Cezar Popescu, rugby union player
Constantin Popescu, politician
Corneliu M. Popescu, poet and translator
Cosmin Alin Popescu, university rector
Cristian Popescu (poet), poet
Cristian Dumitru Popescu, Romanian-American mathematician
Cristian Tudor Popescu, journalist and writer
Cristian Popescu Piedone, politician
Dan Popescu, comic book artist
Dan Ioan Popescu, politician
Daniel Popescu, footballer
David Popescu, soldier and politician
Dimitrie Popescu, rower
Dumitru Radu Popescu, writer and communist activist
Elvira Popescu, actress
Eugen-Cristian Popescu, high jumper
Florin Popescu, canoer
Gabriel Popescu (footballer), football player
Gabriel Popescu (scientist), scientist and engineer
Gheorghe Cartianu-Popescu, engineer
Gheorghe Popescu, football (soccer) player
Ilie Daniel Popescu, artistic gymnast
Ion Popescu-Gopo, animator and cartoonist
Irinel Popescu, surgeon
Liliana Popescu, middle distance runner 
Lucian Popescu, boxer
Maria Popesco, victim of an alleged Swiss judicial error
Marioara Popescu, rower
Mihai Popescu, actor
Mircea Popescu, British engineer
Mircea Popescu (table tennis), Romanian table tennis player
Mitică Popescu, actor
N. D. Popescu-Popnedea, writer
Nicolae Popescu, mathematician
Nicu Popescu, diplomat
Rodica Popescu Bitănescu, actress
Sandu Popescu, Physicist (quantum information)
Spiridon Popescu, writer
Ştefan Popescu, painter
Stela Popescu, actress
Stelian Popescu, journalist and fascist activist
Vasile Popescu, painter

Others 
 Alexandru Candiano-Popescu, soldier, journalist, and political conspirator
 Eufrosina Marcolini (born Eufrosina Popescu), actress and singer
 Moş Ion Popescu, pseudonym of writer Ion Călugăru

Romanian-language surnames